The decolonisation of Africa was a process that took place in the mid-to-late 1950s to 1975 during the Cold War, with radical government changes on the continent as colonial governments made the transition to independent states. The process was often marred with violence, political turmoil, widespread unrest, and organised revolts in both northern and sub-Saharan countries including the Algerian War in French Algeria, the Angolan War of Independence in Portuguese Angola, the Congo Crisis in the Belgian Congo, the Mau Mau Uprising in British Kenya, the Zanzibar Revolution in the Sultanate of Zanzibar, and the Nigerian Civil War in the secessionist state of Biafra.

Background

The "Scramble for Africa" between 1870 and 1914 was a significant period of European imperialism in Africa that ended with almost all of Africa, and its natural resources, being controlled as colonies by a small number of European states. Racing to secure as much land as possible while avoiding conflict amongst themselves, the partition of Africa was confirmed in the Berlin Agreement of 1885, with little regard to local differences. Almost all the pre-colonial states of Africa had lost their sovereignty, with the only exceptions being Liberia (which had been settled in the early 19th century by African-American former slaves) and Ethiopia (later occupied by Italy in 1936). Britain and France had the largest holdings, but Germany, Spain, Italy, Belgium, and Portugal also had colonies. The process of decolonisation began as direct consequence of World War II. By 1977, 50 African countries had gained Independence from European colonial powers.

External causes

During the world wars, African soldiers were conscripted into imperial militaries. Some African soldiers also volunteered. Veterans from over 1.3 million African troops participated in World War II and fought in both European and Asian theatres of war. This led to a deeper political awareness and the expectation of greater respect and self-determination, which was left largely unfulfilled. During the 1941 Atlantic Conference, the British and the US leaders met to discuss ideas for the post-war world. One of the provisions added by President Roosevelt was that all people had the right to self-determination, inspiring hope in British colonies.

On February 12, 1941, United States President Franklin D. Roosevelt and British Prime Minister Winston Churchill met to discuss the post-war world. The result was the Atlantic Charter. It was not a treaty and was not submitted to the British Parliament or the Senate of the United States for ratification, but it turned out to be a widely acclaimed document. One of the clauses, Clause Three, referred to the right to decide what form of government people wanted, and to the restoration of self-government.

Prime Minister Churchill argued in the British Parliament that the document referred to "the States and nations of Europe now under the Nazi yoke". President Roosevelt regarded it as applicable across the world. Anticolonial politicians immediately saw it as relevant to colonial empires. The United Nations Universal Declaration of Human Rights in 1948, three years after the end of World War II, recognised all people as being born free and equal.

After World War II, the US and the African colonies put pressure on Britain to abide by the terms of the Atlantic Charter. After the war, some Britons considered African colonies to be childish and immature; British colonisers introduced democratic government at local levels in the colonies. Britain was forced to agree but Churchill rejected universal applicability of self-determination for subject nations.

Italy, a colonial power, lost its African Empire, Italian East Africa, Italian Ethiopia, Italian Eritrea, Italian Somalia and Italian Libya, as a result of World War II. Furthermore, colonies such as Nigeria, Senegal and Ghana pushed for self-governance as colonial powers were exhausted by war efforts.

The United Nations 1960 Declaration on the granting of independence to colonial countries and peoples stated that colonial exploitation is a denial of human rights and that power should be transferred back to the countries or territories concerned.

Internal causes
Colonial economic exploitation involved the siphoning off of resource extraction (such as mining) profits to European shareholders at the expense of internal development, causing major local socioeconomic grievances. For early African nationalists, decolonisation was a moral imperative around which a political movement could be assembled.

In the 1930s, the colonial powers had cultivated, sometimes inadvertently, a small elite of local African leaders educated in Western universities, where they became familiar with and fluent in ideas such as self-determination. Although independence was not encouraged, arrangements between these leaders and the colonial powers developed, and such figures as Jomo Kenyatta (Kenya), Kwame Nkrumah (Gold Coast, now Ghana), Julius Nyerere (Tanganyika, now Tanzania), Léopold Sédar Senghor (Senegal), Nnamdi Azikiwe (Nigeria), and Félix Houphouët-Boigny (Côte d'Ivoire) came to lead the struggles for African nationalism.

During the second world war, some local African industries and towns expanded when U-boats patrolling the Atlantic Ocean reduced raw material transportation to Europe.

Over time, urban communities, industries, and trade unions grew, improving literacy and education, and leading to pro-independence newspaper establishments.

By 1945 the Fifth Pan-African Congress demanded the end of colonialism, and delegates included future presidents of Ghana, Kenya, Malawi and national activists.

Economic legacy
There is an extensive body of literature that has examined the legacy of colonialism and colonial institutions on economic outcomes in Africa, with numerous studies showing disputed economic effects of colonialism.

The economic legacy of colonialism is difficult to quantify and is disputed. Modernisation theory posits that colonial powers built infrastructure to integrate Africa into the world economy; however, this was built mainly for extraction purposes. African economies were structured to benefit the coloniser and any surplus was likely to be ‘drained’, thereby stifling capital accumulation. Dependency theory suggests that most African economies continued to occupy a subordinate position in the world economy after independence with a reliance on primary commodities such as copper in Zambia and tea in Kenya. Despite this continued reliance and unfair trading terms, a meta-analysis of 18 African countries found that a third of countries experienced increased economic growth post-independence.

Social legacy

Language
Scholars including Dellal (2013), Miraftab (2012) and Bamgbose (2011) have argued that Africa's linguistic diversity has been eroded. Language has been used by western colonial powers to divide territories and create new identities which has led to conflicts and tensions between African nations.

Law
In the immediate post-independence period, African countries largely retained colonial legislation. However, by 2015 much colonial legislation had been replaced by laws that were written locally.

Transition to independence

Following World War II, rapid decolonisation swept across the continent of Africa as many territories gained their independence from European colonisation.

In August 1941, United States President Franklin D. Roosevelt and British Prime Minister Winston Churchill met to discuss their post-war goals. In that meeting, they agreed to the Atlantic Charter, which in part stipulated that they would, "respect the right of all peoples to choose the form of government under which they will live; and they wish to see sovereign rights and self-government restored to those who have been forcibly deprived of them." This agreement became the post-WWII stepping stone toward independence as nationalism grew throughout Africa.

Consumed with post-war debt, European powers were no longer able to afford the resources needed to maintain control of their African colonies. This allowed African nationalists to negotiate decolonisation very quickly and with minimal casualties. Some territories, however, saw great death tolls as a result of their fight for independence.

British Empire

Ghana

On 6 March 1957, Ghana (formerly the Gold Coast) became the first sub-Saharan African country to gain its independence from European colonisation. Starting with the 1945 Pan-African Congress, the Gold Coast's (modern-day Ghana's) independence leader Kwame Nkrumah made his focus clear. In the conference's declaration, he wrote, "we believe in the rights of all peoples to govern themselves. We affirm the right of all colonial peoples to control their own destiny. All colonies must be free from foreign imperialist control, whether political or economic."

In 1948, three Ghanaian veterans were killed by the colonial police on a protest march. Riots broke out in Accra and though Nkrumah and other Ghanaian leaders were temporarily imprisoned, the event became a catalyst for the independence movement. After being released from prison, Nkrumah founded the Convention People's Party (CPP), which launched a wide-scale campaign in support of independence with the slogan "Self Government Now!" Heightened nationalism within the country grew their power and the political party widely expanded. In February 1951, the CPP gained political power by winning 34 of 38 elected seats, including one for Nkrumah who was imprisoned at the time. The British government revised the Gold Coast Constitution to give Ghanaians a majority in the legislature in 1951. In 1956, Ghana requested independence inside the Commonwealth, which was granted peacefully in 1957 with Nkrumah as prime minister and Queen Elizabeth II as sovereign.

Winds of Change
Prime Minister Harold Macmillan gave the famous "Wind of Change" speech in South Africa in February 1960, where he spoke of "the wind of change blowing through this continent". Macmillan urgently wanted to avoid the same kind of colonial war that France was fighting in Algeria. Under his premiership decolonisation proceeded rapidly.

Britain's remaining colonies in Africa, except for Southern Rhodesia, were all granted independence by 1968. British withdrawal from the southern and eastern parts of Africa was not a peaceful process. Kenyan independence was preceded by the eight-year Mau Mau Uprising. In Rhodesia, the 1965 Unilateral Declaration of Independence by the white minority resulted in a civil war that lasted until the Lancaster House Agreement of 1979, which set the terms for recognised independence in 1980, as the new nation of Zimbabwe.

United Kingdom 

The British were primarily interested in maintaining secure communication lines to India, which led to initial interest in Egypt and South Africa. Once these two areas were secure, it was the intent of British colonialists such as Cecil Rhodes to establish a Cape-Cairo railway and to exploit mineral and agricultural resources. Control of the Nile was viewed as a strategic and commercial advantage.

French colonial empire

The French colonial empire began to fall during the Second World War when the Vichy France regime controlled the Empire. One after another, most of the colonies were occupied by foreign powers (Japan in Indochina, Britain in Syria, Lebanon, and Madagascar, the United States and Britain in Morocco and Algeria, and Germany and Italy in Tunisia). Control was gradually reestablished by Charles de Gaulle, who used the colonial bases as a launching point to help expel the Vichy government from Metropolitan France. De Gaulle, together with most Frenchmen, was committed to preserving the Empire in its new form. The French Union, included in the Constitution of 1946, nominally replaced the former colonial empire, but officials in Paris remained in full control. The colonies were given local assemblies with only limited local power and budgets. A group of elites, known as evolués, who were natives of the overseas territories but lived in metropolitan France emerged.

De Gaulle assembled a major conference of Free France colonies in Brazzaville, in central Africa, in January–February 1944. The survival of France depended on support from these colonies, and De Gaulle made numerous concessions. These included the end of forced labour, the end of special legal restrictions that applied to natives but not to whites, the establishment of elected territorial assemblies, representation in Paris in a new "French Federation", and the eventual representation of Sub-Saharan Africans in the French Assembly. However, Independence was explicitly rejected as a future possibility:
The ends of the civilizing work accomplished by France in the colonies excludes any idea of autonomy, all possibility of evolution outside the French bloc of the Empire; the eventual Constitution, even in the future of self-government in the colonies is denied.

Conflict
After the war ended, France was immediately confronted with the beginnings of the decolonisation movement. In Algeria demonstrations in May 1945 were repressed with an estimated 6,000 Algerians killed. Unrest in Haiphong, Indochina, in November 1945 was met by a warship bombarding the city. Paul Ramadier's (SFIO) cabinet repressed the Malagasy Uprising in Madagascar in 1947. French officials estimated the number of Malagasy killed from as low as 11,000 to a French Army estimate of 89,000.

In Cameroun, the Union of the Peoples of Cameroon's insurrection which began in 1955 headed by Ruben Um Nyobé, was violently repressed over two years, with perhaps as many as 100 people killed.

Algeria

French involvement in Algeria stretched back a century. Ferhat Abbas and Messali Hadj's movements marked the period between the two wars, but both sides radicalised after the Second World War. In 1945, the Sétif massacre was carried out by the French army. The Algerian War started in 1954. Atrocities characterized both sides, and the number killed became highly controversial estimates that were made for propaganda purposes. Algeria was a three-way conflict due to the large number of "pieds-noirs" (Europeans who had settled there in the 125 years of French rule). The political crisis in France caused the collapse of the Fourth Republic, as Charles de Gaulle returned to power in 1958 and finally pulled the French soldiers and settlers out of Algeria by 1962. Lasting more than eight years, the estimated death toll typically falls between 300,000 and 400,000 people. By 1962, the National Liberation Front was able to negotiate a peace accord with French President Charles de Gaulle, the Évian Accords in which Europeans would be able to return to their native countries, remain in Algeria as foreigners or take Algerian citizenship. Most of the one million Europeans in Algeria poured out of the country.

French Community

The French Union was replaced in the new 1958 Constitution of 1958 by the French Community. Only Guinea refused by referendum to take part in the new colonial organisation. However, the French Community dissolved itself amid the Algerian War; almost all of the other African colonies were granted independence in 1960, following local referendums. Some colonies chose instead to remain part of France, under the status of overseas départements (territories). Critics of neocolonialism claimed that the Françafrique had replaced formal direct rule. They argued that while de Gaulle was granting independence, on one hand, he was creating new ties with the help of Jacques Foccart, his counsellor for African matters. Foccart supported in particular the Nigerian Civil War during the late 1960s.

Robert Aldrich argues that with Algerian independence in 1962, it appeared that the Empire practically had come to an end, as the remaining colonies were quite small and lacked active nationalist movements. However, there was trouble in French Somaliland (Djibouti), which became independent in 1977. There also were complications and delays in the New Hebrides Vanuatu, which was the last to gain independence in 1980. New Caledonia remains a special case under French suzerainty. The Indian Ocean island of Mayotte voted in referendum in 1974 to retain its link with France and forgo independence.

Female Independence Leaders in Africa 
Nationalist and Independence movements throughout Africa have been predominantly led by men, however, women also held important roles. These roles included organizing at the local and national levels, tending to the wounded, and even being on the front lines of war. Women’s roles in independence movements were diverse and varied by each country. Many women believed that their liberation was directly linked to the liberation of their countries.

Nigeria 
Nigeria was granted independence from the British Empire on 1 October 1960. Before this, various forms and demonstrations against colonial rule took place. Women in Nigeria played a significant role during the movement for national independence. Before independence, women organized through movements like the Abeokuta Women's Revolt and the Women's War.

Margaret Ekpo was one of the most important female independence leaders in Nigeria. She worked toward more equitable civil rights and Nigerian independence.

Margaret Ekpo (1914 - 2006) 
Margaret Ekpo was a chief, a politician, and a nationalist independence leader. In 1945, Ekpo became involved in politics after her husband, Dr. John Udo Ekpo, became dissatisfied with the colonial administration's treatment of indigenous Nigerian doctors. In British-ruled Nigeria, colonial rulers had concentrated the power on male chiefs. After the Women's War, she and other women were appointed to replace warrant chiefs. Ekpo was later appointed to the Eastern House of Chiefs in 1954. As a chief, she rallied women of different ethnic identities to demand women's rights and independence. She was arrested multiple times for instigating these rallies against British colonization. As a warrant chief, Ekpo passed a law that required police to employ more women in Enugu and Lagos.

Before WWII, Ekpo led the Aba Market Women Association in mobilizing women against colonial rule and patriarchal oppression. Following WWII, Ekpo and the Aba Market Women Association continued to mobilize using tactics such as buying up large quantities of scarce commodities and selling them only to registered members of the association who attended meetings regularly. She used this as an opportunity to educate women on the importance of independence and decolonisation.I would tell the women, do you know that your daughter can be the matron of that hospital? Do you know that your husband can be a District Officer (D.O.) or Resident? Do you know that if you join hands with us in the current political activities, your children could one day live in European quarters? I used to tell them these things every time and so they became interested…After being granted independence in 1960, Ekpo participated in the Constitutional Conferences in Lagos and London. Ekpo would also serve as a member of parliament in Nigeria from 1960 to 1966. Ekpo’s work also transcended national politics. She travelled out of Nigeria to represent Nigerian women at several international conferences such as the Inter-Parliamentary Union Conference (1964) and the World Women’s International Domestic Federation Conference (1963).

Along with her work in advocating civil and political rights, Ekpo left a legacy that notably lacked ethnic bias in a country where many forms of ethnicism and nepotism existed in politics.

Tanzania 
Late in 1961, the predecessor state of Tanganyika was established through the Tanganyika Independence Act of 1961. This act ended British rule and established self-government. A new republican constitution was adopted one year later, in December of 1962. This abolished the remaining role of the British monarchy in Tanganyika. A union with the neighbouring state of Zanzibar in 1964 led to the formation of the Republic of Tanzania.

Bibi Titi Mohamed (1926-2000) 
Popularly known as Bibi Titi, Bibi Titi Mohamed was a prominent figure in African women's politics and the independence movement in Tanganyika, mobilizing women to join the Tanganyika African National Union (TANU) political party.

Born in Dar es Salaam, Bibi Titi rose to prominence unexpectedly. Having only four years of primary school education before her political career, she was a housewife and lead singer in a “Bamba'' group. However, as the struggle for freedom amplified, Bibi Titi found a more active role in politics. She joined the Tanganyika African National Union (TANU) in 1954. Doing so, Bibi Titi became TANU’s first female member. She advocated for political freedom as well as the autonomy of women. By the end of the 1950s, Bibi Titi had become a prominent and powerful voice in politics, campaigning on behalf of freedom and development. After gaining popularity, her voice became a powerful source of African feminist and anti-colonial sentiment.

After the establishment of the Republic of Tanzania in 1964, she represented the constituency of Rufiji in Parliament. She also served as a member of TANU’s Central Committee and Executive Committee. There, she continued to advocate for greater freedom and women’s rights.

Bibi Titi left a legacy that calls on women to have greater self-respect and encourages women to strive for more education and equal treatment. In a speech, Bibi Titi implored women to take advantage of their latent political influence saying:I told you [women] that we want independence. And we can’t get independence if you don’t want to join the party. We have given birth to all these men. Women are the power in this world. We are the ones who give birth to the world…

Mozambique 
After almost 10 years of fighting, Mozambique became independent from Portugal in 1975. FRELIMO, the Frente de Libertação de Moçambique or the Mozambique Liberation Front, was created in 1962 to liberate Mozambique from Portugal’s colonial rule. FRELIMO actively recruited women and young girls to join the battle for independence. Female members of FRELIMO were either trained to be guerilla soldiers or part of the nonmilitary wing.

Josina Machel (1945-1971) 
Josina Machel was a prominent leader in FRELIMO and a freedom fighter for Mozambique. She was born to a family that was considered to be “assimilados” which gave them a status of whiteness and privilege. Due to her status, Machel was allowed to receive an education until secondary school. At 18 years old, she attempted to flee the country and join FRELIMO in Tanzania. She was subsequently caught and imprisoned for six months. Machel fled successfully after a second attempt.

After joining FRELIMO, Machel soon became the leader of the women’s wing, Destacamento Feminino. This wing of FRELIMO provided women with political education and military training. Destacamento Feminino also mobilized young women to join FRELIMO.

As a leader, Machel created health centres, schools, and daycare facilities to help people in the liberated zones of Mozambique. She was also nominated to be a delegate in FRELIMO’s second congress, where she staunchly fought for women to be allowed to fully participate in the liberation movement. As a delegate, Machel passed a resolution allowing girls to receive an education.

In 1971, Machel died due to unspecified health problems at the age of 25. She never got to see Mozambique as an independent state. But, she is memorialized in Mozambican history: April 7, the date of her death, is Mozambican Woman’s Day.

Timeline
This table is arranged by the earliest date of independence in this graph; 58 countries have seceded.

List of countries that have gained independence from United States

Colony of Liberia
The Colony of Liberia, later the Commonwealth of Liberia, was a private colony of the American Colonization Society (ACS) beginning in 1822. It became an independent nation—the Republic of Liberia—after declaring independence in 1847.

List of countries that have gained independence from Spain

Spain

List of countries that have gained independence from Portugal

Portugal

Portugal Empire
Ajuda (Whydah, in Benin)
Angola
Annobón
Cabinda
Cape Verde (Cabo Verde)
Ceuta
Fort of São João Baptista de Ajudá
Gorée (in Senegal)
Malindi
Mombasa
Algarve Ultramar (Morocco)
Agadir
Alcacer Ceguer
Arzila
Azamor
Mazagan
Mogador
Safim
 Nigeria (Lagos area)
 Mozambique
Portuguese Gold Coast (settlements along coast of Ghana)
Portuguese Guinea (Guinea-Bissau)
Quíloa
São Tomé and Príncipe
Tangier
Zanzibar
Ziguinchor

Russia
Djibouti
city of Djibouti
Somalia 
Somaliland 
French Somaliland 
Sagallo

Belgium
Belgium controlled several territories and concessions during the colonial era, principally the Belgian Congo (modern DRC) from 1908 to 1960 and Ruanda-Urundi (modern Rwanda and Burundi) from 1922 to 1962. It also had small concessions in Guatemala (1843–1854) and in China (1902–1931) and was a co-administrator of the Tangier International Zone in Morocco.

Roughly 98% of Belgium's overseas territory was just one colony (about 76 times larger than Belgium itself) – known as the Belgian Congo. The colony was founded in 1908 following the transfer of sovereignty from the Congo Free State, which was the personal property of Belgium's king, Leopold II. The violence used by Free State officials against indigenous Congolese and the ruthless system of economic extraction had led to intense diplomatic pressure on Belgium to take official control of the country. Belgian rule in the Congo was based on the "colonial trinity" (trinité coloniale) of state, missionary and private company interests. During the 1940s and 1950s, the Congo experienced extensive urbanization and the administration aimed to make it into a "model colony." As the result of a widespread and increasingly radical pro-independence movement, the Congo achieved independence, as the Republic of Congo-Léopoldville in 1960.

Of Belgium's other colonies, the most significant was Ruanda-Urundi, a portion of German East Africa, which was given to Belgium as a League of Nations Mandate, when Germany lost all of its colonies at the end of World War I. Following the Rwandan Revolution, the mandate became the independent states of Burundi and Rwanda in 1962.

African colonies listed by colonising power

Belgium 
Lado Enclave
 Congo Free State and
 Belgian Congo (today's 
 Democratic Republic of the Congo)
 Ruanda-Urundi (comprising modern
 Rwanda and
 Burundi, 1922–62)

Swedish overseas colonies Africa

Sweden temporarily controlled several settlements on the Gold Coast (present Ghana) since 22 April 1650, but lost the last when on 20 April 1663 Fort Carlsborg and the capital Fort Christiansborg were seized by Denmark.

Cape Coast
In 1652, the Swedes took Cape Coast (in modern Ghana) which had previously been under the control of the Dutch and before that the Portuguese. Cape Coast was centered on the Carolusburg Castle which was built in 1653 and named after King Charles X Gustav of Sweden but is now known as the Cape Coast Castle.

Denmark-Norway

Danish Gold Coast (coastal settlements in Ghana)

Courland

St. Andrews Island (in the Gambia)

Hospitaller Malta

 Tripoli

Netherlands

Arguin Island (in Mauritania)
Dutch Cape Colony
Dutch Gold Coast (settlements along coast of Ghana, including El Mina)
Dutch Loango-Angola (Luanda, Sonyo and Cabinda)
Gorée (Senegal)
Moçambique (Delagoa Bay)
São Tomé
South Africa
Mauritius

Italian Empire 
Italian East Africa
Italian Eritrea
Italian Somaliland (now Somalia)
Italian Ethiopia
Amhara Governorate
Galla-Sidamo Governorate
Harar Governorate
Scioa Governorate
Italian Libya

Former colonies, protectorates and occupied areas 
Italian Eritrea (1882–1947)
Italian Somalia (1889–1947)
Trust Territory of Somaliland (1950–1960)
Libya (1911–1947)
Italian Tripolitania & Cyrenaica (1911–1934)
Italian Libya (1934–1943)
Italian East Africa (1936–1941)
Italian Ethiopia (1936-1941)
Tunisia (1942-1943)

German Empire 

 German Kamerun (now Cameroon and part of Nigeria, 1884–1916)
 German East Africa (now Rwanda, Burundi and most of Tanzania, 1885–1919)
 German South-West Africa (now Namibia, 1884–1915)
 German Togoland (now Togo and eastern part of Ghana, 1884–1914)

After the First World War, Germany's possessions were partitioned among Britain (which took a sliver of western Cameroon, Tanzania, western Togo, and Namibia), France (which took most of Cameroon and eastern Togo) and Belgium

Africa 

The following were German African protectorates:

German South West Africa, 1884 to 1915
German West Africa, 1884 to 1915
Togoland, 1884 to 1916
Kamerun, from 1884 to 1916 
Kapitaï and Koba, 1884 to 1885
Mahinland, March 11, 1885 to October 24, 1885
German East Africa, 1885 to 1918
Witu Protectorate, 1885 to 1890
German Somali Coast, 1885 to 1888
German Congo, 1884 to 1885 
German Katanga, 1886
Gando Protectorate, 1895 to 1897
Gulmu Protectorate, 1895 to 1897
German South Africa, 1884 to 1885

List of German colonies (as of 1912)

German Empire

German East Africa (Burundi, Rwanda, Tanzania)
German South-West Africa (Namibia)
Kamerun (split between Cameroon and Nigeria)
Togoland (split between Togo and Ghana)
Wituland (Lamu Island, owned by Kenya)

French In Africa

French North Africa

 Egypt (1798-1801)
 French Algeria (1830–1962)
 Protectorate of Tunisia (1881–1956)
 Protectorate in Morocco (1912–1956) 
 Military Territory of Fezzan-Ghadames (1943–1951)

French West Africa

 Ivory Coast (1843–1960)
 Dahomey or French Dahomey (now Benin) (1883–1960)
 Independent of Dahomey, under French protectorate in 1889
 Porto-Novo (protectorate) (1863–1865, 1882)
 Cotonou (protectorate) (1868)
 French Sudan (now Mali) (1883–1960)
 Senegambia and Niger (1902–1904)
 Guinea or French Guinea (1891–1958)
 Mauritania (1902–1960)
Adrar emirate (protectorate) (1909)
 The Taganit confederation's emirate (protectorate) (1905)
 Brakna confederation's emirate (protectorate)
 Emirate of Trarza (protectorate) (1902)
 Niger (1890–1960)
 Sultanate of Damagaram (Zinder) (protectorate) (1899)
 Senegal (1677–1960)
 French Upper Volta (now Burkina Faso) (1896–1960)
 French Togoland (1918–1960) (formerly a German colony, mandate became a French colony) (now Togo)
 Nigeria
 The Enclaves of Forcados and Badjibo (territory under a lease of 30 years) (1900–1927)
 The Emirate of Muri (Northeast of Nigeria) (1892–1893)
 Gambia
 Albreda (1681–1857)
 Kunta Kinteh Island (1695–1697, 1702)

French Equatorial Africa

 Chad (1900–1960)
 Oubangui-Chari (currently Central African Republic) (1905–1960)
 Dar al Kuti (protectorate) (1897) (in 1912 its sultanate was suppressed by the French)
 Sultanate of Bangassou (protectorate) (1894)
 Present-day The Republic of Congo, then French Congo (1875–1960)
 Gabon (1839–1960)
 French Cameroon (91% of current Cameroon) (1918–1960) (formerly a German colony, Mandate, Protectorate then French Colony)
 São Tomé and Príncipe (1709)

East Africa and Indian Ocean

 Madagascar (1896–1960)
 Kingdom of Imerina (protectorate) (1896)
 Isle de France (1715–1810) (now Mauritius)
 Djibouti (French Somaliland) (the French Territory of the Afars and the Issas) (French Somalia) (1862–1977)
 French Egypt (1798–1801, 1858–1882, 1956)
 Mayotte (1841–present)
 Seychelles (1756–1810)
 Chagos Archipelago (1721–1745, 1768–1814)
 The Scattered Islands (Banc du Geyser, Bassas da India, Europa Island, Juan de Nova Island, Glorioso Islands, Tromelin Island)
 Comoros (1866–1975)
 Réunion (1710–present)

France

Africa

Africa
This is a list of all present sovereign states in Africa and their predecessors. The region of Africa is generally defined geographically to include the subregions of African continent, Madagascar island, Mauritius Island and several minor islands, and their respective sovereign states. 
Africa was originally colonised by Europeans with Southern Africa  primarily by the British, and the West Africa and North Africa primarily by the British, French, Spanish and Portuguese. Today, Africa consists of 54 sovereign states of various government types, the most common consisting of parliamentary systems.

Timeline notes

See also

 Colonialism
 Decolonization
 Economic history of Africa
 Indépendance Cha Cha
 Scramble for Africa
 List of sovereign states and dependent territories in Africa
 States and Power in Africa
 Wars of national liberation
 Year of Africa

References

Further reading 

 
 Brennan, James R. "The Cold War battle over global news in East Africa: decolonization, the free flow of information, and the media business, 1960-1980." Journal of Global History 10.2 (2015): 333+.
 Brown, Judith M. and Wm. Roger Louis, eds. The Oxford History of the British Empire: Volume IV: The Twentieth Century (2001) pp 515–73. online
 Burton, Antoinette. The Trouble with Empire: Challenges to Modern British Imperialism (2015)
 Chafer, Tony. The end of empire in French West Africa: France's successful decolonization (Bloomsbury Publishing, 2002).
 Chafer, Tony, and Alexander Keese, eds. Francophone Africa at fifty (Oxford UP, 2015).
 Clayton, Anthony. The wars of French decolonization (Routledge, 2014).
 Cohen, Andrew. The politics and economics of decolonization in Africa: the failed experiment of the Central African Federation (Bloomsbury Publishing, 2017).
 Cooper, Frederick. Decolonization and African society: The labor question in French and British Africa (Cambridge University Press, 1996).
 Gordon, April A. and Donald L. Gordon, Lynne Riener. Understanding Contemporary Africa (London, 1996). online
 Hargreaves, John D. Decolonization in Africa (2014).
 Hatch, John. Africa: The Rebirth of Self-Rule (1967)
 James, Leslie, and Elisabeth Leake, eds. Decolonization and the Cold War: Negotiating Independence (Bloomsbury Publishing, 2015).
 Jeppesen, Chris, and Andrew W.M. Smith, eds. Britain, France and the Decolonization of Africa: Future Imperfect? (UCL Press, 2017) online.
 Jerónimo, Miguel Bandeira, and António Costa Pinto, eds. The Ends of European Colonial Empires: Cases and Comparisons (Springer, 2016).
 Khapoya, Vincent B. The African Experience (1994) online
 Louis, William Roger. The transfer of power in Africa: decolonization, 1940–1960 (Yale UP, 1982).
 Louis, Wm Roger, and Ronald Robinson. "The imperialism of decolonization." Journal of Imperial and Commonwealth History 22.3 (1994): 462–511.
 Manthalu, Chikumbutso Herbert, and Yusef Waghid, eds. Education for Decoloniality and Decolonisation in Africa (Springer, 2019).
 MacQueen, Norrie. The Decolonization of Portuguese Africa: Metropolitan Revolution and the Dissolution of Empire (1997) online
Michalopoulos, Stelios; Papaioannou, Elias (2020-03-01). "Historical Legacies and African Development." Journal of Economic Literature. 58#1: 53–128. online 
 Mazrui, Ali A. ed. "General History of Africa" vol. VIII, UNESCO, 1993
 Muschik, Eva-Maria. "Managing the world: the United Nations, decolonization, and the strange triumph of state sovereignty in the 1950s and 1960s." Journal of Global History 13.1 (2018): 121-144.
 Ndlovu‐Gatsheni, Sabelo J. "Decoloniality as the future of Africa." History Compass 13.10 (2015): 485-496. online 
 Rothermund, Dietmar. The Routledge companion to decolonization (Routledge, 2006), comprehensive global coverage; 365pp excerpt 
 Sarmento, João. "Portuguese tropical geography and decolonization in Africa: the case of Mozambique." Journal of Historical Geography 66 (2019): 20-30.
 Seidler, Valentin. "Copying informal institutions: the role of British colonial officers during the decolonization of British Africa." Journal of Institutional Economics 14.2 (2018): 289-312. online
 Strang, David. "From dependency to sovereignty: An event history analysis of decolonization 1870-1987." American Sociological Review (1990): 846–860. online 
 Thomas, Martin, Bob Moore, and Larry Butler. Crises of Empire: Decolonization and Europe's imperial states (Bloomsbury Publishing, 2015).
 von Albertini, Rudolf. Decolonization: the Administration and Future of the Colonies, 1919-1960 (Doubleday, 1971) for the viewpoint from London and Paris.
 White, Nicholas. Decolonization: the British experience since 1945 (Routledge, 2014).
 Wilder, Gary. Freedom time: negritude, decolonization, and the future of the world (Duke University Press, 2015). excerpt 
 Winks, Robin, ed. The Oxford History of the British Empire: Volume V: Historiography (2001) ch 29–34, pp 450–557. How historians covered the history online
 Wood, Sarah L. "How Empires Make Peripheries: 'Overseas France' in Contemporary History." Contemporary European History (2019): 1-12. online

External links
 Africa: 50 years of independence Radio France Internationale in English
 "Winds of Change or Hot Air? Decolonization and the Salt Water Test" Legal Frontiers International Law Blog

Decolonization
History of Africa
European colonisation in Africa
Aftermath of World War II
Decolonization by region